Munjeong is a neighbourhood, dong of Songpa-gu, Seoul, South Korea.

Education
Schools located in Munjeong-dong:
 Seoul Munjeong Elementary School
 Seoul Gawon Elementary School
 Moondeok Elementary School
 Munjeong Middle School
 Munjeong High School

Transportation 
 Munjeong station of

See also
Administrative divisions of South Korea

References

External links
 Munjeong resident center website
 Songpa-gu map

Neighbourhoods of Songpa District